Breanne Hill  is an actress from Salem, New Hampshire.

Early life
Formerly known as Breanne Parhiala, she went to North Salem Elementary School and graduated from Salem High School in 2008. Hill attended Boston University before dropping out to become an actress. During her time at the University, she competed for the Terriers' division 1 track & field team.

Career 
A frequent collaborator with Brad Peyton, she has a recurring role as Mary in the Discovery Channel and Netflix original production Frontier.

She appeared in the Peyton-directed films Incarnate, San Andreas, and Rampage, the latter two of which star Dwayne Johnson.

References

External links

Actresses from New Hampshire
Living people
Year of birth missing (living people)
21st-century American women